Villalonga Fútbol Club is a football team based in Vilalonga in the autonomous community of Galicia. Founded in 1947, the team plays in  the Preferente Autonómica de Galicia. The club's home ground is San Pedro, which has a capacity of 2,000 spectators.

Season to season

21 seasons in Tercera División

Notable players
 Ruben Cerqueiras
 David Bistilleiro
 Ivan Parada
 José Núñez
 Adrián Santos
 Ivan Renda
 Santi Padin
 Javier Pazos
 Adrián Padin
 Jose Filgueira
 Manuel Ramilo
 Manu
 Aarón Paredes
 Aarón Trelles

External links
Futbolme team profile 

Football clubs in Galicia (Spain)
Association football clubs established in 1947
1947 establishments in Spain